
Lake Juturnaiba (Lagoa de Juturnaíba) is a lake in Rio de Janeiro, Brazil, near the town of Juturnaíba.

Other reading

Lakes of Brazil
Landforms of Rio de Janeiro (state)